Katsimpalis is a village in the municipal unit of Gortyna, southwest Arcadia, Greece. It is situated on a hillside above the right bank of the river Alfeios. It is 2 km southwest of Zoni, 3 km east of Kyparissia, 6 km southeast of Karytaina and 7 km northwest of Megalopoli. There is a large lignite mine to the south. The Greek National Road 76 (Krestena - Andritsaina - Megalopoli) passes through the village. In 2011 Katsimpalis had a population of 32.

Population

See also
List of settlements in Arcadia

References

External links
History and information about Katsimpalis
Katsimpalis on the GTP Travel Pages

Gortyna, Arcadia
Populated places in Arcadia, Peloponnese